Rayhānah bint Zayd was a Jewish woman from the Banu Nadir tribe, who became a concubine of the Islamic prophet Muhammad, after the Incident of Banu Qurayza in 627 CE (5 AH). She is considered by some Muslims as being one of Muhammad's wives.

Biography 
Rayhana was born into the Banu Nadir tribe, and became part of the Banu Qurayza tribe upon her marriage.

Ibn Sa'd wrote that Rayhana went on to be manumitted and subsequently married to Muhammad upon her conversion to Islam. Al-Tha'labi agreed that she became one of Muhammad's wives and cited evidence that he paid a mahr for her. Ibn Hajar makes reference to Muhammad giving Rayhana a home upon their marriage. Antonie Wessels suggested that Muhammad married Rayhana for political reasons due to her dual affiliation with both the Banu Nadir and Banu Qurayza tribes, while Lesley Hazleton felt it was evidence of Muhammad creating alliances. Conversely, Barakat Ahmad felt such rationale to support the notion of Rayhana and Muhammad's marriage was "meaningless" due to the annihilation of both tribes by Muhammad's forces.

Similar to Maria al-Qibtiyya, there is not universal consensus among Islamic scholars as to whether Rayhana was officially one of Muhammad's wives. Hafiz ibn Minda and Shibli Nomani, for example, believed that she returned to the Banu Nadir upon her manumission.

Rayhana died in 631, 11 days after hajj, and was buried at the Al-Baqi Cemetery in Medina along with other wives of Muhammad.

See also
 List of non-Arab Sahabah
 Companions of the prophet

References

Banu Nadir
7th-century Arabian Jews
Wives of Muhammad
7th-century women
Converts to Islam from Judaism
Jewish Saudi Arabian history
Arabian slaves and freedmen
Medieval slaves
Muslim female saints
Burials at Jannat al-Baqī
Slave concubines